KYLX-LD (channel 13) is a low-power television station in Laredo, Texas, United States, affiliated with CBS and The CW Plus. It is owned by Gray Television alongside dual NBC/ABC affiliate KGNS-TV (channel 8) and Telemundo affiliate KXNU-LD (channel 10). The stations share studios on Del Mar Boulevard (near I-35) in northern Laredo, while KYLX-LD's transmitter is located on Shea Street north of downtown.

History
KYLX-LD first went on the air on July 1, 1999 as K55HW on channel 55, and was owned by Border Media Partners. It changed its call letters to KNEX-LP in 2002, matching co-owned radio station KNEX (106.1 FM). Under Border Media Partners, the station was affiliated with Mas Musica and later MTV Tres before it switched programming to Azteca América. The station later disaffiliated from Azteca América and the station started broadcasting audio from KQUR-FM on a rotating-color screen with its call sign and channel number. In 2009, Border Media Partners LLC transferred the station to Border Media Business Trust pursuant to a forbearance agreement between Border Media Partners and its lenders.

The station was off-the-air for almost a year, as all broadcasting on channels above 51 was ended by the Federal Communications Commission (FCC) on December 31, 2011; KNEX applied to operate in digital on channel 42 but later applied to operate on 14; in December 2012, the FCC approved this request. Since late December 2012, KNEX had been testing its signal on channel 14.3.

In March 2012, Eagle Creek Broadcasting, owner of KVTV (channel 13), agreed to purchase KNEX-LP from Border Media Business Trust. Under Eagle Creek, KNEX's digital test broadcasts would include simulcasts of KVTV's programming. On May 18, 2015, Eagle Creek Broadcasting reached a deal to sell KNEX-LP to Gray Television, owner of KGNS-TV (channel 8), for $25,000; upon taking control on July 1, 2015, Gray changed the station's call letters to KYLX-LP. On the same day, Gray also acquired the non-license assets of KVTV from Eagle Creek and moved its programming, including the CBS affiliation, to KYLX, at which point KVTV ceased operations.

As part of the application, the KVTV technical facilities were retained. The construction permit for channel 14 was abandoned; instead, KNEX filed for a digital companion channel on channel 13 at 3 kW ERP — the same technical parameters as KVTV, but on a low-power license, which Gray could legally own. Eagle Creek also filed for special temporary authority to use those facilities immediately. The STA was granted on June 16, 2015. The KYLX-LD facility was fully licensed on September 29, 2015.

In October 2015, KYLX launched The CW on its 13.2 digital subchannel, bringing Laredo an over-the-air CW affiliate for the first time since KGNS-DT2 switched to ABC in July 2014. The ABC subchannel simulcasts KSAT's late newscast.

Subchannels
The station's digital signal is multiplexed:

References

External links
KYLX-LD2 "Laredo CW 19"

YLX-LD
Gray Television
CBS network affiliates
Television channels and stations established in 1999
1999 establishments in Texas
Low-power television stations in the United States